Carss Cottage is a heritage-listed former cottage and park ranger's residence and now historical museum locate in  Carss Bush Park at 74 Carwar Avenue, Carss Park, Georges River Council, New South Wales, Australia. It was built during 1865 by Scottish masons. The property is owned by the Georges River Council. It was added to the New South Wales State Heritage Register on 2 April 1999.

History 

Within ten months Croft sold the land to William Barton on 17 October 1853 for A£352. This land speculation was to continue for another two years with sales in June 1854 to John Chappellow, for A£538 and in September 1855 to Lewis Gordon possibly in default of a mortgage.

Carss was one of fifty tradesmen (stonemasons and carpenters) who had been recruited in Glasgow by Dr John Dunmore Lang. Carss arrived in Sydney in 1831 accompanied by his wife Helen Turnball. A cabinet maker by trade he found work as the chief carpenter and joiner for the construction of Lyndhurst under John Verge, architect.

Carss Cottage is believed to have been built by December 1865, when Carss changed his address to the 'George's River, Kogarah'. The house is reputed to have been constructed by the Scottish masons who had been employed in the construction of Edmund Blacket's University of Sydney buildings. The stone was reported to be quarried on site from a huge rock in the vicinity of the present-day Norfolk Island pine tree.

William Carss died on 26 May 1878. He was survived by his children Mary, Anne and James. There was also a housekeeper called Amelia Claggett. Carss was buried in the vault near the present day recreation centre. Carss' wife died in 1853. The property was transferred to the daughters Mary and Anne on 1 August 1878. This was subsequently amended on 3 April 1879 solely to Mary. On Mary Carss' death in 1916 the cottage was bequeathed to the Sydney Sailors' Home apparently in accordance with her father's wish. The transfer however did not eventuate until after James' death in the following year. James married the housekeeper, Amelia Claggett, on his death bed. Amelia Claggett remained in the cottage until she was forced to vacate taking most of the furniture with her.

In the mid 1920s the trustees of the Sydney Sailors' Home sold the property to the Kogarah Council for A£12,000. The estate was divided into recreational and residential spaces. The  portion that was reserved for park purposes was opened and dedicated on Australia Day 1924 and the remaining 374 suburban lots were offered for sale that day.

The cottage was converted to a new use as the residence of the park's ranger. The first ranger was Joseph Harald Coxhead, who held the position between 1924 and 1953. In 1928 a health inspector's report noted extensive white ant activity, inadequate ventilation and poor drainage. At this time outbuildings were demolished and internal alterations and modifications made to the cottage. During the 1930s landscaping works included the construction of the stone walling, arbor and stone seats.

As a result of the enthusiasm aroused by the lead-up to the 1970 James Cook bicentenary celebrations, Kogarah Council decided to form a historical society and to lease Carss Cottage to the Historical Society for use as a historical museum.

Description 
The cottage has sandstone walls and a slate roof.

Condition 

Physical condition is good. Archaeological potential is excellent for those documented demolished original outbuildings.

Modifications and dates 
1865 - built
1924 - estate subdivided and cottage converted for park ranger
1928 - outbuildings demolished and internal alterations and modifications made to the cottage.
1930s - landscaping works included the construction of the stone walling, arbor and stone seats.

Heritage listing 
As at 2 August 2012, Carss Cottage formed a substantial part of a rare setting and is one of the oldest buildings in the southern Sydney area south of the Cooks River. It is the oldest building in the Kogarah area and is associated with the early development of the Kogarah area. William Carss was of sufficient stature in Sydney society in the 1830s as a master craftsman to have been a member of the founding committee of the Sydney Mechanics School of Arts in 1834. It is a rare example of mid Victorian period stone homestead in the southern area of Sydney. Situated on a knoll close to Kogarah Bay and through its largely unspoilt setting, it plays an integral role in the aesthetic and architectural quality of the Bay.

Carss Cottage was listed on the New South Wales State Heritage Register on 2 April 1999 having satisfied the following criteria.

The place is important in demonstrating the course, or pattern, of cultural or natural history in New South Wales.

It forms a substantial part of a rare setting and is one of the oldest buildings in the southern Sydney area south of the Cooks River. It is the oldest building in the Kogarah area and is associated with the early development of the Kogarah area. William Carss was of sufficient stature in Sydney society in the 1830s as a master craftsman to have been a member of the founding committee of the Sydney Mechanics School of Arts in 1834.

The place is important in demonstrating aesthetic characteristics and/or a high degree of creative or technical achievement in New South Wales.

It is a rare example of mid Victorian period stone homestead in the southern area of Sydney. Situated on a knoll to Kogarah Bay and through its largely unspoilt setting, it plays an integral role in the aesthetic and architectural quality of the Bay.

The place possesses uncommon, rare or endangered aspects of the cultural or natural history of New South Wales.

It is the oldest building in the Kogarah area and one of the oldest in the southern Sydney area.

See also 

Australian residential architectural styles

References

Bibliography

Attribution

External links

New South Wales State Heritage Register
Houses in Sydney
Museums in Sydney
Articles incorporating text from the New South Wales State Heritage Register
1865 establishments in Australia
Houses completed in 1865
Sandstone buildings in Australia